Meraa Ghar Mere Bachche is a 1985 Indian Hindi-language film directed by Chander Vohra and produced by L. V. Prasad. It stars Raj Babbar, Smita Patil, Meenakshi Sheshadri in pivotal roles.

Cast
 Raj Babbar as Balwant Bhargav / Arun Bhargav
 Smita Patil as Geeta
 Meenakshi Sheshadri as Sarita
 Vijayendra Ghatge as Dr. Shrikant Bhargav
 Sushma Seth as Heerabai
 Asrani as Lallan
 Dinesh Hingoo as Mukadam

Soundtrack
Lyrics: Anand Bakshi

References

External links

1980s Hindi-language films
1985 films
Films scored by Laxmikant–Pyarelal